Morpheis pyracmon, the fissured bark, is a moth in the family Cossidae. It was described by Pieter Cramer in 1780. It is found in Suriname, Venezuela, Ecuador and Peru. The habitat consists of cloudforests, where it is found at altitudes between 400 and 1,200 meters.

References

Zeuzerinae
Moths described in 1780